Mark Knowles and Daniel Nestor were the defending champions and successfully defended their title, defeating Leander Paes and Nenad Zimonjić 3–6, 6–3, 6–2 in the final. It was the 39th doubles title for Knowles and the 41st doubles title for Nestor, in their respective careers. It was also the 4th and final title of the year for the pair.

Seeds

Draw

Draw

External links
 Main Draw (ATP)

Doubles